The Chicago Teddy Bears is an American sitcom that aired on CBS. The series was part of the network's 1971 fall lineup, premiering on September 17, 1971.

Synopsis
Unlike other shows set in Prohibition-era Chicago, The Chicago Teddy Bears was a sitcom. Any threats of violence were inferential rather than overt.

The main characters were Linc McCray (Dean Jones) and his Uncle Latzi (John Banner), partners in a speakeasy. A small-time gangster named "Big" Nick Marr (Art Metrano) wants to take it over. Marr is McCray's cousin and Latzi's nephew; the naive Latzi finds it hard to believe his nephew could be anything but a fine boy. However, Marvin the bookkeeper (Marvin Kaplan) and Linc's inept bodyguards, especially Duke (Jamie Farr), are very frightened of Marr.

The series was intended as a comeback vehicle for Ann Sothern, whose last regular role had been as the voice of My Mother the Car. She played a street flower vendor in the pilot and was meant to be a mediator between McCray and Marr. However, CBS wrote her out of the actual series.

The series received low ratings and was cancelled by CBS after only three months on the air. It ranked 70th out of 78 shows that season with an average 11.8 rating. The opening credits for this series can be found on YouTube.

Episodes

References

Brooks, Tim and Marsh, Earle, The Complete Directory to Prime Time Network and Cable TV Shows

External links
 

1971 American television series debuts
1971 American television series endings
1970s American sitcoms
CBS original programming
English-language television shows
Television series by Warner Bros. Television Studios
Television series set in the 1920s
Television shows set in Chicago